1,3-Propanediol is the organic compound with the formula CH2(CH2OH)2.  This 3-carbon diol is a colorless viscous liquid that is miscible with water.

Products
It is mainly used as a building block in the production of polymers such as polytrimethylene terephthalate.

1,3-Propanediol can be formulated into a variety of industrial products including composites, adhesives, laminates, coatings, moldings, aliphatic polyesters, and copolyesters. It is also a common solvent. It is used as an antifreeze and as a component in wood paint.

Production
1,3-Propanediol is mainly produced by the hydration of acrolein. An alternative route involves the hydroformylation of ethylene oxide to form 3-hydroxypropionaldehyde.  The aldehyde is subsequently hydrogenated to give 1,3-propanediol. Biotechnological routes are also known.

Two other routes involve bioprocessing by certain micro-organisms:
 Conversion from glucose effected by a genetically modified strain of E. coli by DuPont Tate & Lyle BioProducts (See: bioseparation of 1,3-propanediol). An estimated 120,000 tons were produced in 2007". According to DuPont, the Bio-PDO process uses 40% less energy than conventional processes, Because of DuPont and Tate & Lyle's success in developing a renewable Bio-PDO process, the American Chemical Society awarded the Bio-PDO research teams the "2007 Heroes of Chemistry" award. 
 Conversion from glycerol (a by-product of biodiesel production) using Clostridium diolis bacteria and Enterobacteriaceae.

Safety
1,3-Propanediol does not appear to pose a significant hazard via inhalation of either the vapor or a vapor/aerosol mixture.

See also
 Butylene glycol
 Ethylene glycol
 Polylactic acid
 Propylene glycol

References

External links
 Manufacturer's brochure describing uses of 1,3-propanediol

Alcohol solvents
Alkanediols